The play-offs of the 2017 Fed Cup Europe/Africa Zone Group II were the final stages of the Group II zonal competition involving teams from Europe and Africa. Using the positions determined in their pools, the eight teams faced off to determine their placing in the 2017 Fed Cup Europe/Africa Zone Group II. The top two teams advanced to Group I, and the bottom two teams were relegated down to the Group III for the next year.

Promotional play-offs 
The first-placed teams of each pool played against the second-placed teams of the other pool in head-to-head rounds. The winner of each round advanced to the 2018 Europe/Africa Zone Group I.

Slovenia vs. Luxembourg

Denmark vs. Sweden

Relegation play-offs 
The third-placed teams of the pools played against the fourth-placed teams in a head-to-head round. The loser of each round was relegated to the 2018 Europe/Africa Zone Group III.

Norway vs. Lithuania

Egypt vs. South Africa

Final placements 

References

External links 
 Fed Cup website

2017 Fed Cup Europe/Africa Zone